Antoine Kaldas (born January 20, 1984), also known as Tony Kaldas, is an Egyptian-Greek singer, composer, performer, and healer who spent his first 25 years in Egypt.

Kaldas has developed a passion for artistic expression as early on as 4 years by imitating actors and actresses after watching films and plays shown on television. Despite his interests, he had a restricted childhood and his parents did not appreciate his "talents". Upon turning sixteen, Kaldas sang a religious French song that launched his musical career. He blends several genres, notably jazz, classical, pop, and world music, and languages through his songs and concerts in an attempt create a variety of unique pieces.
 
He studied classical singing for 6 years at the Cairo Opera House while also studying architecture. . Kaldas studied architecture and worked for years as an underground singer, as well as an art director, graphic designer, retoucher and digital marketeer. He also worked as a voice actor for Arabic versions of Disney movies and commercial advertisements. Additionally, Kaldas has studied different types of healing practices, such as quantum touch, chakra healing, and hypnotherapy, combining these methods with his knowledge of music and voice . 

His performance in Brussels, in 2012, representing the Middle East in an Arabic song, was written by the late Gibran Khalil Gibran, and composed & performed by Kaldas himself.

Early life
Kaldas was born January 1984 in Cairo, Egypt, the son of an Egyptian father and a Greek mother.  He displayed musical talent at a young age, performing musicals at the age of 4. His parents were resistant as they were afraid that he would not commit to his studies and that this would negatively affect his life. Kaldas was unable to convince his family otherwise and was thus unable to pursue his musical interests for years to come. The self-taught musician continues to use a "musical shorthand" that he developed as a child, rather than employing traditional musical notation.

However, the house was full of different music throughout the day, which Kaldas believed to be an important influence for him; he was lucky to be present among a family that enjoyed listening to different kinds of music.

He went to a French school in 1989, College des Freres, which had a great influence on his personality and expression that continued with him afterward.

In 2003, Kaldas studied Classical Singing at Cairo Opera House along with his studies at the Architecture university. He was greatly inspired by the singer Asmahan as she was an Arabic singer that could sing in different genres and styles and studied classical music for sometime. His love for Asmahan began when he was 9 years old, much to everyone's astonishment as the singer died in 1944, 40 years before he was even born.

Music career
In 2000, Kaldas joined the French Christian Choir in Cairo. Soon after, he began performing in Egyptian venues and eventually around the world.

2012: Living Abroad
After his nomination for the Peace Prize in Brussels in January 2012, and his performance in Paris afterward, he decided to live in France for some time to be able to learn new vocal techniques and start singing in different countries.

Kaldas lived in Paris, Lille, and then moved to Cambridge and then London. Through his travels, instead of learning more about singing and performance techniques, he learned more about himself.

Influences, music and concerts

Musical Influences
From childhood, Kaldas accepted a wide variety of musical styles, listening to radio stations from Northern Africa, Arab countries, and Europe. His music has been said to reflect his encounters with cultures around the world.

The mixture in his family was translated through the choice of songs chosen by his family, as he was raised listening to Classical singing, Arabic, Greek, French, Italian, Spanish and English songs, along with the classical music. This mixture was expressed later through his talent and voice by always mixing different genres together and being one of the first musicians and singers in the Middle East creating fusion on stage.

Kaldas claims to have had a perfect pitch since childhood.

Concerts
Kaldas sang cover versions of songs sung by the Arabic Super-stars :Fairuz, Abdel Halim Hafez, Mohamed Abdel Wahab, Umm Kulthum, Nour el Hoda etc... and from the Worldwide he used to sing for Charles Aznavour, Édith Piaf, Mireille Mathieu, Frédéric François, Jacques Brel, Elvis Presley, Frank Sinatra, Nat King Cole, etc..
In 2005, he sang cover versions of Umm Kulthum and Asmahan many songs like: "Raq el habeeb, Gholbt asaleh, Fakarouny, Nawet adary alamy, Emta hataeraf, Layaly el ons, Ya layaly el bishr, etc. He also sang cover versions of the Lebanese singer Majida El Roumi many songs from her big repertoire like: Enta el mady, Matra'ak bi alby, Lawen maey el ayam, Beirut set el donya, Am yesaalouny, etc...)
In December 2006 he sang a concert of cover versions under the name of (Tony Kaldas sings Charles Aznavour) at Chateau de Ghouri in Egypt.
Also he sang in some Opera Recitals many Arias from Aria Antiche and Opera Roles Like La Traviata, Tosca, and others.
in September 2007, he sang in a Common Concert with the soprano Maysa Orensa, a big repertoire containing Arabic, French, Italian, German songs at the Cairo Opera House
In October 2007, he sang with the Egyptian singer Rania Shaalan in one of her concert in Gomhoreya Theatre – Cairo Opera House
During 2006–2007, he did 3 religious songs and he wrote and sang a song about the Lebanese superstar Majida El Roumi as a dedication to her voice. The song was called "Negma men negoum el sama"
2008 was a year of success at the Jubilee 125 years of the Lebanese poet, painter and writer Khalil Gibran.
On June 27, in The Opera House – Gomhoureya Theatre.
On July 16 in Bibliotheca Alexandrina – Open Air Theatre.
2008 Performed at Diwan Bookstore a Ramadan Night, a nostalgic night in September which was covered by the Daily News (Egypt)
 2009 he performed on 2 occasions in Smash Club celebrating the Valentine's Day and Sham el nessim.
 June 2009, commemorating the Lebanese writer Mansour Rahbani in Sawy Culturewheel, covered by OTV, ON TV, ANA TV and Nile Live TV, and media presses Elaph and Radio stations.
 September 2009, he performed a big concert in Cairo Opera House singing for Fairuz, Halim and his own songs from Gibran Khalil Gibran words "You are my brother", "My soul"
 2011, Kaldas celebrated 70 years on Besame Mucho song with the help of the Mexican Embassy in Cairo for the copyrights and the song renewed with Arabic lyrics and different arrangement mixing Jazz, Latin and Oriental.
 2011, he released after the Egyptian revolution a song clip from the lyrics of the international Lebanese writer and poet Gibran Khalil Gibran for the religious tolerance and the song is the official work for the Peace day 2011 and showed on 25 channels around the world
 2012, he was nominated for the Music Peace Prize in Brussels, which he was one among important international performers.
 2012, Kaldas was chosen to be part of the big music project 'One Prayer' in Oslo, Norway in October, he composed his part and wrote the lyrics on a music already prepared for the performers to perform on it.

Honors, awards and distinctions
Kaldas was honoured in Brussels European Parliament in 2012 and he was nominated for the Music Peace Prize Time for Peace; he was the first Arabic/Greek singer was nominated for this prize.

See also 
Cairo Opera House
list of Egyptians

References

External links
Official web site

1984 births
21st-century Egyptian male singers
Singers from Cairo
Living people
Greek classical musicians
Greek electronic musicians
New-age composers
Private Music artists
Musicians from Cairo